Yoni Tabac (born 21 April 1980) is an Israeli actor of Romanian descent who is best known for his role in the film Polanski.

Life
Tabac was born and raised in Israel.  Tabac received a fine arts bachelor's degree in acting, specializing in lighting design and technical direction in Israel. He toured with the Israeli Repertory Theatre while also working as a technician and rigger for the University Theatre in Haifa. During this period, Tabac also working with several production houses to introduce classical drama and contemporary theater productions to Israel.

After completing Israeli military duty in 2002, Tabac migrated to Los Angeles, United States.  In Los Angeles, Tabac has worked within several different theater projects, including becoming a member of the Beverly Hills Playhouse. Founded by theater director and drama teacher, Milton Katselas, the Beverly Hills Playhouse is one of Los Angeles' oldest acting schools.

Movies
 The Bait
 Dockweiler
 Nic & Tristan Go Mega Dega
 Shrink
 Babycakes
 Man Stroke Woman
 Wild Girls Gone
 All Souls Day: Dia de los Muertos
 A Thousand Words
 I'm Not Gay
 The Forgotten Jewel

References

External links
 
 Stand-up comedy routine by Yoni Tabac

1980 births
Living people
Israeli people of Romanian-Jewish descent
Israeli male film actors
Israeli male stage actors
Israeli emigrants to the United States
Male actors from Los Angeles
People from Haifa